The Battle of Yultong, also known as the Battle of Puluodong, Battle of Yuldong, or Battle of Yuldong-ri, was a battle of the Korean War. It was fought between elements of the Chinese People's Volunteer Army (PVA) 34th Division (44th Division from Chinese sources) and the Filipino 10th Battalion Combat Team (BCT), north of Yeoncheon during April 22–23, 1951. The battle was part of the Chinese Spring Offensive.

Background 
The Philippine 10th BCT was attached to the U.S. 3rd Infantry Division at the time of the offensive. Initially composed of 1,367 troops, the battalion was reduced to 900 men due to previous casualties and other losses. To prepare for the incoming PVA offensive, the U.S. 65th Infantry Regiment deployed its 3rd and 2nd Battalions, facing west and northwest, respectively, along the Imjin River, while the attached Philippine 10th BCT held the regiment’s right flank near Route 33. The Turkish Brigade, was just east of the Filipino unit.

Opposite the United Nations Command forces in the area were the PVA's III Army Group, composed of the 12th, 15th, and 60th Armies. The overall commander of the PVA forces, Peng Dehuai, planned to have the 12th and 15th Army attack and encircle the Turkish Brigade and the U.S. 3rd Infantry Division, respectively. Near the Imjin River, the 15th Army had a narrow zone between the river and Route 33 projecting through the area held by the 65th Regiment. Along Route 33 and east of it, the 12th Army and 60th Army were to attack through ground held by the Philippine 10th BCT on the right flank of the 3rd Division and through the Pogae-san ridges occupied by the Turkish Brigade and 24th Infantry Division.

The battle 

The assault began at 20:00 on 22 April when the enemy hit the Turkish Brigade with an artillery barrage. Shortly after midnight, an artillery and mortar barrage followed by intense small-arms and machine gun fire struck the entire 3rd Division line. While the Turkish Brigade were engaged in fierce battle, the 10th BCT, deployed in the Yultong area on the left of the Turkish Brigade, from 23:00 was assaulted in waves by the PVA and fought a series of close combat engagements within its positions. Communication with the 65th Regiment was disconnected by enemy artillery and some friendly fire support but was restored at 00:30. Around midnight, the Turkish Brigade were ordered to withdraw to a position on the Line Kansas south of the Hantan River. The 65th Regiment's 2nd Battalion was forced to fall back several hundred yards to regroup due to the intensity of the PVA attack. At 01:00 of 23 April, the 29th and 44th Divisions of the PVA 15th Army surrounded the 65th Regiment, cutting off its retreat. The battle forced the 10th BCT's drivers, typists, clerks, medics, cooks, and even the chaplain to join the active combatants. Each company was dispersed and fought in confusion without contact between the units. The battalion's Baker (B) Company, commanded by Lt. Jose Artiaga, Jr., was defending the strategic Yultong Hill when PVA forces overran their position; the left platoon of B Company was pushed back from their position at 03:00 and, after four hours of furious combat, the PVA infiltrated as deeply as Charlie (C) Company position in the reserve area. The company suffered heavy casualties, including Lt. Artiaga. The battalion commander, Col. Dionisio S. Ojeda, received orders to withdraw. All units complied, except the Tank (renamed into Heavy Weapons) Company. Tank Company commander Capt. Conrado Yap led a counterattack towards the hill to rescue any survivors and recover the dead men of B Company. Although Capt. Yap lost his life in the counterattack, Tank Company succeeded in their objective and recovered a squad of survivors. The 10th BCT held their positions until early morning and covered the retreat of the U.S. 3rd Division. At first light, the PVA offensive gradually declined, and the battalion launched a counterattack to restore the lost area of B Company. C Company supported by two M24 Chaffee light tanks of Recon Company and an allied artillery unit led the counterattack. At 09:00 on 23 April, Gen. James Van Fleet, commander of the U.S. Eighth Army, ordered a withdrawal to Line Kansas after concluding that many units in I and IX Corps were in danger of being enveloped by the PVA forces. At 12:15, the 10th BCT finally received orders from Gen. Robert Soule to fall back to Line Kansas, withdrawing to a position in Anhung-ri.

Aftermath 

For their actions, Capt. Conrado D. Yap was posthumously awarded the Philippine Medal of Valor and the U.S. Distinguished Service Cross, while Lt. Jose Artiaga, Jr. was posthumously awarded the Philippine Distinguished Conduct Star. On July 27, 2018, Capt. Yap was awarded the First Class Taegeuk Cordon of the Order of Military Merit on the 65th anniversary of the Korean Armistice Agreement.

The 10th Battalion Combat Team reported 12 killed, 38 wounded, and 6 missing in action. PVA losses were reported to be more than 500 killed and 2 captured.

On 24 April 1951, the 10th BCT was attached to the British 29th Brigade Group as a reserve force, and would later participate in the attempted rescue of the Gloucestershire Regiment during the Battle of the Imjin River.

On 22 April 1966, the 15th anniversary of the Chinese Spring Offensive, a monument was erected to commemorate the battle in Yeoncheon, South Korea.

Notes

Bibliography

Further reading

Uldarico Baclagon, Philippine Campaigns, Graphic House (Publishing), 1958
Baclagon, Military History of the Philippines, Saint Mary's Publishing, 1975

Yultong
Yultong
Yultong
April 1951 events in Asia
China–Philippines relations
Philippines–South Korea relations
Battles and operations of the Korean War in 1951
History of Gyeonggi Province